
This is a list of major London County Council housing developments in the period 1889-1965:

Follow on
After the LCC transitioned into the GLC in 1965, many of the architectural staff stayed on in the Council's Architect's Department, whilst others moved to individual London boroughs

See also
 List of large council estates in the UK

References

External links
Museum of London - Council Housing

 
 London County Council
London-related lists
Housing developments